Richard Milward (born 26 October 1984 in Middlesbrough) is an English novelist. His debut novel Apples was published by Faber in 2007. He has also written Ten Storey Love Song and most recently Kimberly's Capital Punishment. Raised in Guisborough, Redcar and Cleveland, he attended Laurence Jackson School and Prior Pursglove College, then studied fine art at Byam Shaw School of Art at Central Saint Martins College of Art and Design in London. He cites Trainspotting by Irvine Welsh as the book that made him want to write and Jack Kerouac, Richard Brautigan and Hunter S. Thompson as influences. He joined fellow Teessider Michael Smith in writing a column for Dazed & Confused magazine.

Apples

Milward's debut novel is an account of teenage life on a Middlesbrough housing estate. It is narrated in the first person by several characters (including a butterfly), but mainly by Adam and Eve, two school students. Adam is a shy, ungainly youth with obsessive compulsive disorder, a love of The Beatles, and a violent father. He believes himself to be in love with Eve, who is an attractive and promiscuous hard drinker and drug user.

Bibliography

Novels
Apples (2007)
Ten Storey Love Song (2009)
Kimberly's Capital Punishment (2012)

References

External links

Faber author page
Times feature 'Teenage kicks', April 28, 2007
3:AM Magazine interview (02/2008)

1984 births
21st-century English novelists
Living people
English male novelists
People from Guisborough
21st-century English male writers